Smyrna karwinskii, or Karwinski's beauty, is a species of crescents, checkerspots, anglewings, etc. in the butterfly family Nymphalidae.

The MONA or Hodges number for Smyrna karwinskii is 4547.1.

References

Further reading

 

Nymphalini
Articles created by Qbugbot
Butterflies described in 1833